Kunsthal Aarhus is a contemporary arts centre located at the heart of the city of Aarhus in Denmark.

The institution initiates, commissions, produces and presents art at an international level to local, regional, and international audiences. Kunsthal Aarhus has its focus on cutting edge art in a broad context and to a wide audience, as part of a sustainable approach. It provides a research based participatory, collaborative and transdisciplinary platform for artistic experimentation and critical engagement. Kunsthal Aarhus strives to be an inclusive, transparent, dynamic and flexible institution that fosters the culture of appreciation and values diversity of contributions.

History 
Kunsthal Aarhus was established in 1917 on the initiative of Aarhus Art Association of 1847, and it remains the only arts centre in Aarhus and one of the oldest in Denmark and Europe. With its founding mission to "inspire and promote a general knowledge of the fine arts", the art's centre was received with great enthusiasm by the public and has since played a central role in developing and presenting international contemporary art in Denmark.
Originally designed by architect Axel Høeg-Hansen, the institution went through a process of artistic and architectural expansions, most notably by C. F. Møller Architects in the 1990s and 2000s, to take its current form with over 1,000 m2 of exhibition spaces, which doubled the exhibition space and increased the number of visitors.

Aarhus Kunsthal has 1,000 m2 of exhibition halls, making it one of Denmark’s largest and most important venues for contemporary art. On display are solo exhibitions, thematic exhibitions, special exhibitions and dialogue exhibitions between Danish and foreign artists covering all fields of artwork from painting and sculpture to photography, film and video.

From 2013, one of the first significant changes associated with the new programme, is the development of a new visual identity in collaboration with the Danish strategic design firm Designit. As part of the process of reconnecting its history and future vision, "Århus Kunstbygning" has been transformed into "Kunsthal Aarhus".

Publications
 Bolt B. & Jakobsen J. (2010) This World We Must Leave -  An Idea of Revolution

References

External links

Official website
"The Aarhus Art Building, extensions", C. F. Møller Architects.
FKD Danish Association of Art Centers 

Arts centres in Denmark
Buildings and structures in Aarhus
Tourist attractions in Aarhus
Art exhibitions in Denmark
Buildings and structures completed in 1917
1917 establishments in Denmark
Neoclassical architecture in Aarhus